Por Toda Minha Vida (English: All My Life) is a Brazilian television series produced and broadcast by Rede Globo. His first episode aired on December 28, 2006. It is the Brazilian television series with the most nominations (6 in total) to the Emmy Award.

Episodes

Cast

Elis Regina 
 Hermila Guedes - Elis Regina
 Bianca Comparato - Elis Regina (teenager)
 Thavyne Ferrari - Elis Regina (child)
 Dan Stulbach - Luís Carlos Miele
 Eriberto Leão - César Camargo Mariano
 Alexandre Schumacher - Ronaldo Bôscoli
 Paulo Gustavo - Ary Barroso
 Bem Gil - Gilberto Gil
 Jéssica Marina - Lourdinha
 Cássio Scapin - Ary Rego
 Blota Filho - Paulo Machado de Carvalho Filho
 Ana Roberta Gualda - Celina Silva
 Frederico Eça - Milton Nascimento
 Maria Clara Guim

Leandro 
 Thommy Schiavo - Leandro
 Eduardo Di Tarso - Leonardo
 Geraldo Peninha - Avelino da Costa
 Eliene Narducci - Dona Carmem
 Camila Capucci - Anália Maria de Souza
 Ana Lima - Amália
 Gilberto Miranda - Jovelino
 André Luiz Frambach - Leandro (child)
 Hugo Lacerda - Leonardo (child)
 Adassa Martins - Fátima Costa
 Cássia Gentile - Ede Cury
 Alexandre Mofati
 Carlos André Faria
 Cássio Pandolfi
 Charles Rodrigues
 Chico Sant'Anna
 Christina Dantas
 Fernando Paganote
 Giselli Cohen
 Junior Prata
 Jonas Gadelha
 Julia Sabugosa
 Ricardo Brant
 Verônica Rocha
 Wanda Grandi

Renato Russo 
 Bruce Gomlevsky - Renato Russo
 Vinicius Rodrigues - Renato Russo (teenager)
 Ricardo Gadelha - Dado Villa-Lobos
 Rafael Rocha - Marcelo Bonfá
 Alex Brasil - Renato Rocha
 Pedro Struchiner - Fê Lemos
 Bruno Autran - Flávio Lemos
 Pierre Baitelli - André Pretorius
 Amilton Monteiro - Renato Manfredini
 Vânia de Brito - Maria do Carmo Manfredini
 Thalita Ribeiro - fan
 Antônio Carlos Feio
 Cristelli
 Diego Riques
 Fábio Felipe
 Jayme Berenguer
 João Nunes
 Karol di Nassif
 Lana Gulero
 Liv Izar
 Miguel Lunardi
 Nina Morena
 Remo Trajano
 Romulo Zanotto
 Saulo Acoverde
 Sávio Moll
 Teo Baross

Nara Leão 
 Inez Viegas - Nara Leão
 Pérola Faria - Nara Leão (teenager)
 Rafael Magaldi - Roberto Menescal
 Leonardo Netto - Miguel Bacelar
 Rafael Fernnades - Ronaldo Bôscoli
 Rafael Raposo - Cacá Diegues
 Jorge Maia - João do Vale
 Jorge Lucas - Zé Ketti
 Branca Messina - Silvinha Telles
 André Engracia - Chico Buarque
 Rômulo Estrela - Carlinhos Lyra
 Maurício Silva - Patrício Teixeira
 Marcela Moura - Altina
 Junyor Prata - Jairo Leão
 Pablo Falcão - João Gilberto
 Daniela Guaraná - Yara
 Gabriella Chafin - Helena Floresta (young)
 Thiare Amaral - Helena Floresta
 André Delucca
 Carla Pompilio
 Cláudia Borione
 Cláudio Galvan
 Denise Negra
 Marina D'Elia
 Mauro José
 Ronald Santos
 Sérgio Zoroastro
 Thaire Maia

Tim Maia 
 Charles Maia - Tim Maia (adult)
 Robson Nunes - Tim Maia (teenager)
 Bruno Arguilhes Fisher - Tim Maia (child)
 Marcelo Flores - Michael Sullivan
 Gláucio Gomes - Roberto Talma
 Aline Borges - Janete
 Renato Reston - Roberto Carlos
 Wanessa Morgado - Nice
 André Pimentel - Jairo Pires
 Luci Pereira - Maria Imaculada
 Adolpho Passinato - Jorge Ben 
 Alberto França - José Roberto
 Alexandro Camara - Arlenio Lívio
 Antonio dos Santos - Edson Trindade
 Aroldo Macedo - Wellington
 Bruno Arguilles - Tim Maia
 Bruno Bebiano
 Cássio Nascimento
 Christovam Netto
 Deiwis Jamaica
 Dério Chagas
 Ely Vigortega
 Erika Berg
 Evandro Melo
 João Cunha
 Jorge Crespo
 José Leal
 Luciano Pullig
 Luiz Nicolau
 Luiz Ramalho
 Marize Mota
 Potiguara Novazzi
 Raquel Dutra
 Samantha Brandão

Mamonas Assassinas 
 Fabrízio Teixeira - Dinho
 Flávio Pardal - Júlio Rasec
 Anderson Lau - Bento Hinoto
 Douglas Rosa - Samuel Reoli
 Rômulo Estrela - Sérgio Reoli
 Fernanda de Freitas - Valéria Zopello
 Diogo Novaes - Rafael Ramos
 Antônio Fragoso - João Augusto
 Graziella Schmitt - Mina
 Humberto Carrão - Rafael
 Tuini Bitencourt - Sueli de Oliveir
 Lolita Nagano - Dona Toshiko
 Rose Germano - Nena dos Reis de Oliveira
 Elder Gatelly - Nelson Lima
 Gabriel Azevedo - Joni Anglister
 Vanessa Monteiro - Grace Kellen
 Cláudia Tisato - Célia
 Robert Guimarães - Rick Bonadio
 Carlos Vieira - Joni Anglister
 Alcemar Vieira - Ito Reis de Oliveira
 Paulo Ascenção - Hildebrando Leite
 Alex Gomes - Dinho's friend 
 Ivo Muller - Márcio
 Leonardo Oda - Maurício
 Aury Porto - Jorge
 Ronaldo Tortelly - Owner stadium Thomeuzão
 Luíz Eduardo Machado
 Fábio Florentino
 Fábio Spinardi
 Raul Labancca
 Alan Medina
 Clóvis Gonçalves

Dolores Duran 
 Nanda Costa - Dolores Duran
 Vitória Pina - Dolores Duran (child)
 Rachel de Queiroz - Dolores Duran (teenager)
 Akin Garragari - Paulo Moura
 Bruno Bebianno - Alberico Campana
 Wendy Loyola - Lela
 Ridan Pires - Vinicius de Moraes
 José Mauro Brandt - Antonio Maria
 Arthur Kohl - Barão
 Cyrano Rosalém - Armindo
 Anna Cotrim - Helenita
 Izabel Lima
 João Cunha
 Paulo Gustavo
 Rosana Prazeres
 Malu Rocha
 Andrea Dantas
 Duda Mamberti
 Ana Abbott
 Bruno Stierli
 Antonio Carlos Feio
 Augusto Garcia
 Renan Monteiro
 Sérgio Guizé
 André Mendes
 Rafael Rocha
 Otávio Martins
 Ivens Godinho
 Renata di Carmo
 Vania Veiga
 Clayton Echevesti
 Elsa Pinheiro 
 Antonio Entriel
 Clayton Rasga

Chacrinha 
 Hélio Vernier - Chacrinha
 Alessandro Tchê - Chacrinha (young)
 Léo Oliveira - Abelardo Barbosa (child)
 Bárbara Castro - Aurélia (young)
 Prazeres Barbosa - Aurélia
 Ceceu Valença - Leleco Barbosa
 Ana Clara Gründler - Angélica (child)
 Teca Pereira - Parteira de Chacrinha
 Marcos Veras - Nanato (son)
 Cris Nicolotti - Maria Lúcia
 Russo - ele mesmo
 Sidney Magal - Himself
 Jerry Adriani - Himself
 Alessandra Diamante - Chacrete
 Carina Moraes - Chacrete
 Marcello Gonçalves - Father's Chacrinha
 Alexandra Plubins
 Tiago Robert
 Samir Murad
 Michelle Martins
 Marco Bravo
 Leonardo Thierry
 Mário José Paz
 Francisco Silva
 Kendi
 Camila Caputti
 Irene Serejo
 Kelzy Scard
 Renato Reston
 Antonio dos Santos
 Carlos Félix
 Bruna Guerin
 Pablo Uranda
 Luana Xavier
 José Antonio Gomes
 Carolina Bezerra
 Cacá Monteiro

Cazuza 
 Daniel Granieri - Cazuza (from 15 to 30 years)
 Leonardo Rocha - Cazuza (from 10 to 14 years)
 Lígia Cortez - Lucinha Araújo
 Paulo Carvalho - João Araújo
 Pitty Webbo - Bebel Gilberto
 Ricardo Blat - Ezequiel Neves
 Flávio Tolezani - Ney Matogrosso
 Eduardo Pires - Dé Palmeira
 Alexandre Lemos - Roberto Frejat
 Caio Graco - Maurício Barros
 Charles Myara - Rodrigo Santos
 Fabio Gozzi - Peninha
 Felipe Lima - Fernando
 Gabriel Scheer - Dadi
 Gildo Coelho - Guto Goffi
 Gláucio Gomes - Roberto Talma
 Luciano Luppi - Vinicius de Moraes
 Ricardo Clemente
 Tiago Salomone - Pedro Bial
 Débora Bloch - Bete

Claudinho 
 Alex Gomes - Claudinho
 Adriano de Jesus - Buchecha
 Cristina Fagundes - Vanessa Alves
 Carlos Seidl - Ivan Manzieli
 Élida Muniz - The girl at the ball
 Aldo Perrota - Falcão
 André Luiz Rocha - Alex Bolinha
 Carlos Alves Peixoto - DJ Malboro
 Carolina Bezerra - Rozana Souza
 Diego Batista
 Emerson Gomes
 Ewerton Nathan dos Santos
 João Antônio
 Luciano Vidigal
 Luis Octávio
 Magda Gomes
 Marcio Costa
 Marília Coelho - Natalina Souza
 Matheus de Sá - Claudinho (child)
 Matheus Moreira - Buchecha (child)
 Raphael Rodrigues
 Rhudson Lewkyan
 Ruan Ricardo Guimarães Silva
 Saulo Rodrigues - Maciel
 Thogun - Valdir
 Victor Andrade
 Wendell Passos
 Xandy Britto

Raul Seixas 
 Júlio Andrade - Raul Seixas
 Pietro Sargentelli - Paulo Coelho
 Bruno Abrahão - Plínio Seixas (child)
 Rafael Almeida - Raul Seixas (to 18 years)
 Leonardo Leal - Raul Seixas (to 12 years)
 Thelmo Fernandes - musical productor
 Paulo Carvalho - doctor
 Luiz Nicolau - Raul Varella Seixas (Father's Raul)
 Aline Peixoto - Maria Eugenia Santos Seixas
 Carolina Lyrio - Elizabeth Seixas
 Charles Fricks - Marco Mazzola
 Cristiane Ferreira - Sonia Bahia (Teacher's Raul)
 Daniela Pessoa 
 Douglas Rosa - Délcio Gama
 Emmanuel Pasqualini - Thildo Gama
 Gibran Lamha - Eládio Gilbraz
 Jack Berraquero - Evandro Ribeiro
 João Pedro Zappa - Jerry Adriani
 Larissa Henrique - Vivian Seixas
 Léo Oliveira - Waldir
 Linn Jardim - Edith Wisner Seixas
 Maria Laura Nogueira - Kika Seixas
 Marcio Machado - Mauro Motta
 Marco Marcondes - Sérgio Sampaio
 Mario Hermeto - Marcelo Nova
 Nicolas Bauer - Toninho Buda
 Paula Rebelo - Tania Menna Barreto
 Pedro Cavalcante - Nélson Motta
 Rachel Gutville

Adoniran Barbosa 
 Hugo Nápoli - Adoniran Barbosa (elderly)
 Marcello Airoldi - Adoniran Barbosa (adult)
 Cassio Pandolfi - Ferdinando
 Ricardo Pettine - Jorge
 Fabíula Nascimento - Matilde de Lutiis
 Erlene Melo - Olga
 Glauce Graieb - Ema Rubinato
 Caike Luna - Rancinho
 Ângela Barros - Marta
 Blota Filho - Osvaldo
 Leandro Oliva - Mato Grosso
 Cláudia Borioni - Márcia
 Caio Zaccariotto - Raul Torres
 Cassio Pandolfi - Ferdinando
 Cristiana Pompeo - Matilde
 Diogo Salles - Carlinhos Vergueiro
 Elaine Babo
 Erlene Melo
 Franco Ventura - Luíz Barbosa
 Gabriela Linhares
 Gabriel Sequeira - Osvaldo Moles
 Gilberto Miranda  
 Julio Adrião 
 Julio Calasso
 Leandro Oliva
 Marcelo Laham - The owner of the radio
 Marco Biglia
 Ricardo Pettine - Jorge
 Rodrigo Ceva Nogueira 
 Rodrigo Pessin
 Tadeu di Pietro 
 Waldir Gozzi

RPM 
 João Gevard - Paulo Ricardo
 Ricardo Monastero - Luiz Schiavon
 Pierre Santos - Fernando Deluqui
 Bruno Martins - Paulo Pagni
 Alexandre Mandarino - Charles Gavin
 Euler Santi - Marcelo Rubens Paiva
 Carlos Loffler - Ezequiel Neves
 Marco Audino - Ney Matogrosso
 Ricardo Von Busse - Marquinho Costa
 Luis Lobo - Franco Júnior
 Willian Vorhees - Milton Nascimento
 Eduardo Canuto
 Fábio Marcoff
 Fábio Guará
 Lucas Antunes
 Gildo Coelho - Guto Goffi

Cartola 
 Wilson Rabelo - Cartola (elderly)
 Alex Brasil - Cartola (adult)
 Miguel Oliveira - Cartola (child)
 Marizilda Rosa - Dona Zica
 Maurício Gonçalves - Sebastião Joaquim de Oliveira
 Alexandre Mofati - Carlos
 André Corrêa - Élton Medeiros
 Claudio Handrey - Gradim
 Cosme da Viola - Mário Reis
 Danilo Moraes - Francisco Alves
 Olívia Araújo - Donária
 Domingos Meira - Sílvio Caldas
 Gustavo Ottoni - Sebastiao
 Helena Varvaki - Aída
 Jana Morais - Deolinda
 Jean Paul - Donga
 Jorge Caetano - Pinxinguinha
 Leonardo Netto - Joao da Baiana
 Luciano Vidigal - Zé da Zilda
 Marcelo Várzea - Heitor Villa-Lobos
 Marcio Fonseca - Alcebíades Barcellos
 Marcos França
 Michelle Valle
 Romis Ferreira
 Samuel de Assis - Paulinho da Viola
 Wilmar Amaral

As Frenéticas 
 Nina Morena - Sandra Pêra
 Corina Sabbas - Dhu Moraes
 Flávia Rubim - Regina Chaves
 Lis Maia - Leiloca
 Gabrielle Lopez - Lidoka
 Denise Spíndola - Edyr Duque
 Fellipe Marques - Nelson Motta
 Marcos Audino - Ney Matogrosso
 Jean Beppe - Liminha
 Sidy Correa - Ruban Barra
 Ubiraci Miranda - Ponciano
 Márcia Di Milla - Dona Glória
 Adriano Petermann - Roberto de Carvalho
 Carlos Caff
 Ana Carolina Rosa Moura
 Catherine Beranger
 Ana Lelis
 Ana Zettel
 Alair Rodrigues

Awards

References

External links 
 
 Por Toda Minha Vida at the Memoria Globo

Rede Globo original programming
Brazilian television series
2000s Brazilian television series
2010s Brazilian television series